Budge is a verb, meaning to move.

Budge can also refer to:
 Budge of court, free food and drink in a royal court
 Budgebudge, a city in the state of West Bengal, India
 Budge Hall, a building at Brigham Young University
  Budge, a mediaeval term for lamb's skin fur clothing or trimming with the wool showing outwards

People:
 Ann Budge, Scottish businesswoman
 Bill Budge, computer game programmer and designer
 BudgeCo, a company founded by Bill Budge
 E. A. Wallis Budge, English Egyptologist, Orientalist, and philologist
 Edward Budge, English theologian and geologist
 Hamer H. Budge, American legislator and judge
 Paul Budge, British businessman, finance director of the Arcadia Group
 Richard Budge (1947–2016), British coal mining entrepreneur 
 Susan Budge (born 1959), ceramic sculptor
 Budge Crawley, Canadian film producer

In sports:
 Don Budge, American tennis champion
 Grahame Budge, former Scotland rugby player
 Budge Patty, American tennis player
 Budge Pountney, former rugby player and director
 Budge Rogers, former England rugby player
 Adam Cole, American Professional Wrestler

Others
 Budge Studios, a Canadian video game company
"Budge", a song by Dinosaur Jr. from the album Bug, 1988

See also 
 BUDG